Great Expectations is a 1999  television film adaptation of Charles Dickens’s 1861 novel of the same name. It was aired on BBC Two in the UK, and on Masterpiece Theatre in the US.

Plot 
A young boy called Pip stumbles upon a hunted criminal who threatens him and demands food. A few years later, Pip finds that he has a benefactor. Imagining that Miss Havisham, a rich lady whose adopted daughter Estella he loves, is the benefactor, Pip believes in a grand plan at the end of which he will be married to Estella. However, when the criminal from his childhood turns up one stormy night and reveals that he, Magwitch, is his benefactor, Pip finds his dreams crumbling. Although initially repulsed by his benefactor, Pip gradually becomes loyal to him and stays with him until his death.

Cast

Filming Locations
The production filmed at a number of Kent locations including Sheerness Docks, Kingswear Castle Paddlesteamer, Chatham Docks and the River Medway and in Edinburgh.

Awards 
In 2000, it won the BAFTA TV Award for Best Costume Design, but failed to win Best Design, Best Make Up/Hair, Best Photography and Lighting (Fiction/Entertainment) and Best Sound (Fiction/Entertainment). It had also won the 1999 RTS Craft & Design Award for Best Sound in Drama; Best Production Design in Drama; Best Lighting, and Photography & Camera; and was nominated for Best Tape & Film Editing in Drama. It was nominated for, but did not win, the 1999 Emmy Award for Outstanding Miniseries.

References

External links 
 
 
 
 

1999 British television series debuts
1999 British television series endings
1990s British drama television series
BBC television dramas
1990s British television miniseries
Films based on Great Expectations
Films directed by Julian Jarrold
Television series produced at Pinewood Studios
English-language television shows
Television shows set in England
Television shows based on Great Expectations